Dunn Loring is a Washington Metro station in Fairfax County, Virginia, on the Orange Line. The station is in Merrifield, with a Vienna mailing address. The station is in the median of Interstate 66 at Gallows Road, just outside the Capital Beltway, and is accessed by a footbridge over the eastbound lanes.

History
The station opened on June 7, 1986. By 1993, officials in Fairfax City were looking to add "Merrifield" to the station name. In 1998, the station name was changed to "Dunn Loring–Merrifield". On November 3, 2011, the station returned to its original name, with "Merrifield" listed as a subtitle.

In May 2018, Metro announced an extensive renovation of platforms at twenty stations across the system. The platforms at the Dunn Loring station would be rebuilt starting in mid-2020.

From May 23 until September 7, 2020, this station was closed due to the platform reconstruction project which closed stations west of Ballston–MU station.

Station layout

Development project
In August 2011, Mill Creek Residential Trust, in cooperation with WMATA, began development on a new mixed-use development area known as Alexan Dunn Loring. The project was required to not reduce the number of parking spaces available to Metro riders. The first completed step was to remove the existing kiss and ride area, as well as the bus bays. This area became the primary Metro parking lot, while the old parking lot was built into a new parking garage. The new parking garage opened in August 2013. After the parking garage opened, construction began on the mixed-use development in the area of the temporary parking lot. Phase 1 of the mixed-use development project was scheduled to be completed in the first quarter of 2014. Construction was expected to be completed in 2015.

References

External links 
 

 The Schumin Web Transit Center: Dunn Loring Station
 Gallows Road entrance from Google Maps Street View

Washington Metro stations in Virginia
Stations on the Orange Line (Washington Metro)
Railway stations in the United States opened in 1986
Transportation in Fairfax County, Virginia
1986 establishments in Virginia
Bus stations in Virginia